The Rana Ujeshwori Bhagwati temple is located inside the Tansen Durbar square in Palpa district of Nepal. The temple was built by Ujir Singh Thapa as an offering to Goddess Bhagwati on the occasion of victory by Nepal Army over British Raj in Anglo-Nepali War (1872 BS).

The temple was  destroyed by the earthquake of 1990 BS   and was renovated by Pratap Shamsher Jung Bahadur Rana.

Bhagwati Jatra
A festival called Bhagwati Jatra (also called Sindoor Jatra) is celebrated every year on the next day of Krishna Janmastami. This festival has been celebrated since 1877 BS.

See also
Bhairabsthan Temple
List of Hindu temples in Nepal

References

Hindu temples in Lumbini Province
Buildings and structures in Palpa District
Tansen, Nepal